Neville Gilbert Beard (born 19 November 1936) is a former Australian rules footballer who played with Perth in the West Australian National Football League (WANFL) from 1956 to 1963.

Beard played mostly as a ruck-rover and in defence. He won the Sandover Medal in 1961, beating Ray Sorrell on a countback. Beard represented Western Australia just once in his career, against South Australia at Perth in 1962. He had been selected in the Brisbane Carnival squad the previous year but was unable to play due to an injury.

His father, Bert played in the Victorian Football League in the 1930s.

References

External links

Australian rules footballers from Fremantle
Perth Football Club players
Sandover Medal winners
1936 births
Living people